In Greek mythology, the name Batea or Bateia refers to the following individuals:
 Batea, daughter of King Teucer of the Teucrians.
 Batea, a Naiad, who married King Oebalus of Sparta. Their sons were Hippocoon, Tyndareus and Icarius. She also becomes somewhat relevant in Plato's dialogues. Plato implies Batea is her name given by the Gods and Myrina the one called by mortals in Cratylus (dialogue).

Notes

References 

 Apollodorus, The Library with an English Translation by Sir James George Frazer, F.B.A., F.R.S. in 2 Volumes, Cambridge, MA, Harvard University Press; London, William Heinemann Ltd. 1921. ISBN 0-674-99135-4. Online version at the Perseus Digital Library. Greek text available from the same website.

Naiads
Princesses in Greek mythology
Queens in Greek mythology